Limax cinereoniger is a large species of air-breathing land slug in the terrestrial pulmonate gastropod mollusk family Limacidae, the keelback slugs. This is the largest land slug species in the world.

Distribution
This slug is native to Europe. It is recorded in most of Europe, including Bulgaria, Czech Republic (where it is of least concern), Italy, Netherlands, Slovakia, Great Britain, Ireland, Finland, Ukraine, and several other countries. It occurs east as far as the Urals. It is common in much of its range, but mostly rare or absent in southernmost Europe. Although known from the Iberian Peninsula and the Balkans, there are no records from Portugal or Greece.

Description
With a maximum length exceeding 20 centimeters, this species is the largest land slug.

Habitat
This species lives in woodlands and occasionally parks.

Parasites 
Parasites of Limax cinereoniger include nematodes of genus Elaphostrongylus and Agfa flexilis.

References

External links 

 Limax cinereoniger at Animalbase taxonomy,short description, distribution, biology, status (threats), images

Limacidae
Gastropods described in 1803
Endemic fauna of Europe